Discoverer 28, also known as Corona 9021, was an American optical reconnaissance satellite which was lost in a launch failure in 1961. It was the seventh of ten Corona KH-2 satellites, based on the Agena-B.

The launch of Discoverer 28 occurred at 00:01 UTC on 4 August 1961. A Thor DM-21 Agena-B rocket was used, flying from Launch Complex 75-1-1 at the Vandenberg Air Force Base. It failed to achieve orbit after the Agena's guidance and control system malfunctioned.

Discoverer 28 was to have operated in a low Earth orbit. Images were to have been recorded onto  film, and returned in a Satellite Recovery Vehicle. The Satellite Recovery Vehicle carried by Discoverer 28 was SRV-512.

References

Spacecraft launched in 1961
Satellite launch failures